Mount Boyd is a pyramidal mountain,  high, standing  west of Mount Bennett, in the Bush Mountains. It was discovered and photographed by the United States Antarctic Service, 1939–41. It was surveyed by A.P. Crary, leader of the U.S. Ross Ice Shelf Traverse Party (1957–58), and named by him for Walter Boyd, Jr., a glaciologist with the party.

References 

Mountains of King Edward VII Land